The National Land Code, is a Malaysian laws which enacted to amend and consolidate the laws relating to land and land tenure, the registration of title to land and of dealings therewith and the collection of revenue therefrom within the States of Johore, Kedah, Kelantan, Malacca, Negeri Sembilan, Pahang, Penang, Perak, Perlis, Selangor, Terengganu and the Federal Territory of Kuala Lumpur, and for purposes connected therewith.

Preamble
WHEREAS it is desired to introduce in the form of a National Land Code a uniform land system within the States of Johore, Kedah, Kelantan, Malacca, Negeri Sembilan, Pahang, Penang, Perak, Perlis, Selangor, Terengganu and the Federal Territory of Kuala Lumpur:
AND WHEREAS provision has been made by the National Land Code (Penang and Malacca Titles) Act 1963, for the introduction of a system of registration of title to land in the States of Penang and Malacca, for the issue of replacement titles, for the assimilation of such system to the provisions of the National Land Code, and for matters incidental thereto:
AND WHEREAS it is now expedient for the purpose only of ensuring uniformity of law and policy to make a law with respect to land tenure, registration of titles relating to land, transfer of land, leases and charges in respect of land, and easements and other rights and interests in land:

Structure
The National Land Code, in its current form (1 January 2006), consists of 6 Divisions and 35 Parts containing 447 sections and 16 schedules (including 37 amendments).
 Division I: Introductory
 Part 1: Preliminary
 Part 1A: Computerized Land Registration System
 Part 1B: Modifications to Facilitate the Implementation of the Pengurusan Danaharta Nasional Berhad Act 1998 
 Part 1C: Modifications to Facilitate the Implementation of the Electronic Land Administration System
 Part 2: Administration
 Chapter 1: Powers of the Federation and of Federal Officers
 Chapter 2: Powers of the States and of State Officers
 Chapter 3: General Provisions Relating to Officers, etc.
 Chapter 4: Provisions Relating to Enquiries
 Part 3: Rights and Powers of the State Authority
 Chapter 1: Property in Land and Powers of Disposal
 Chapter 2: Classification and Use of Land
 Chapter 3: Rights of Access to, and Use of, Alienated Lands
 Division II: Disposal of Land
 Part 4: Disposal Otherwise than by Alienation
 Chapter 1: Reservation of Land
 Chapter 2: Temporary Occupation of Land
 Chapter 3: Removal of Rock Material
 Chapter 4: Permit to Use Air Space Above State Land and Reserved Land
 Part 5: Disposal by Alienation
 Chapter 1: Introductory
 Chapter 2: Approval of Land for Alienation
 Chapter 3: Alienation under Final Title
 Part 5A: Disposal of Underground Land
 Division III: Alienated Lands; Incidents and Registration of Title
 Part 6: Rent
 Chapter 1: General
 Chapter 2: Collection of Arrears of Rent
 Chapter 3: Revision of Rent
 Part 7: Conditions and Restrictions in Interest
 Chapter 1: General
 Chapter 2: Summary of Conditions and Restrictions in Interest Affecting Alienated Lands
 Chapter 3: Implied Conditions
 Chapter 4: Express Conditions and Restrictions in Interest
 Chapter 5: Enforcement of Conditions
 Part 8: Forfeiture
 Part 9: Sub-division, Partition and Amalgamation
 Chapter 1: Sub-division of Lands
 Chapter 2: Partition of Lands
 Chapter 3: Amalgamation of Lands
 Chapter 4: Sub-division of Buildings
 Part 9A: Powers of Attorney
 Part 10: Preparation and Maintenance of Registers on Final Title
 Chapter 1: The Registers
 Chapter 2: (Repealed)
 Chapter 3: Final Title in Continuation of Final Title
 Chapter 4: Replacement of Register Document of Final Title
 Part 11: Final Title and Qualified Title
 Chapter 1: Introductory
 Chapter 2: Alienation under Qualified Title
 Chapter 3: Qualified Title in Continuation
 Chapter 4: Conversion of Qualified Title into Final Title
 Part 12: Surrender of Title
 Power to Surrender
 Procedure for Surrender of Whole
 Procedure for Surrender of Part Only
 Surrender and Re-alienation Contiguous Lots Held under Land Office Title
 Surrender and Re-alienation Special Provisions
 Division IV: Alienated Lands: Dealings
 Part 13: General
 Part 14: Transfers
 Powers of Transfer
 Transfers of Land
 Transfers of Undivided Shares
 Transfers of Leases and Charges
 Transfers of Exempt Tenancies
 Part 15: Leases and Tenancies
 Chapter 1: Powers of Leasing, etc.
 Chapter 2: Express and Implied Provisions
 Chapter 3: Forfeiture
 Chapter 4: Determination of Leases and Tenancies 
 Part 16: Charges and Liens
 Chapter 1: Creation of Charges, and General Provisions Relating Thereto
 Chapter 2: Implied Provisions
 Chapter 3: Remedies of Chargees: Sale
 Chapter 4: Remedies of Chargees: Possession
 Chapter 5: Discharge
 Chapter 6: Liens
 Part 17: Easements
 Chapter 1: Creation
 Chapter 2: Release, Extinguishment and Cancellation
 Part 18: Registration of Dealings
 Chapter 1: Presentation of Instruments for Registration
 Chapter 2: Procedure Generally
 Chapter 3: Determination of Fitness for Registration
 Chapter 4: Manner of Registration
 Chapter 5: Powers of Attorney
 Chapter 6: Cancellation of Registration
 Chapter 7: Endorsement of Exempt Tenancies
 Part 19: Restrains on Dealing
 Chapter 1: Caveats
 Chapter 2: Prohibitory Orders 
 Division V: Alienated Lands - Supplemental
 Part 20: Indefeasibility of Title and Interest
 Part 21: Co-proprietorship and Trusts
 Chapter 1: Co-proprietorship
 Chapter 2: Trusts
 Part 22: Transmission on Death and Bankruptcy
 Death
 Bankruptcy
 Part 23: Reversion in Absence of Proprietor
 Part 24: Re-survey of Land Having Natural Boundaries
 Part 25: Sub-divided Buildings
 Division VI: General and Miscellaneous
 Part 26: General Powers and Duties of the Registrar
 Part 27: Searches
 Part 28: Land Administrator's Rights of Way
 Part 29: Survey
 Chapter 1: General
 Chapter 2: Deposited Plans
 Part 30: Registration of Statutory Vesting
 Part 31: Jurisdiction of the Court
 Part 31A: Power of Investigation
 Part 32: Powers of Arrest and Seizure and Penalties
 Part 33: Service and Publication of Notices
 Part 33A: Restrictions in Respect of Non-Citizens and Foreign Companies
 Part 34: Miscellaneous
 Part 35: Repeals, Transitional Provisions, etc.
 Schedules

References

External links
 National Land Code 

1965 in Malaysian law
Malaysian federal legislation